Tim Slover is an American playwright and professor of theatre studies at the University of Utah.

Slover has a bachelor's degree in English from Brigham Young University and an M.A. and Ph.D. from the University of Michigan.

Besides widely performed plays, Slover also wrote the script for A More Perfect Union. His play "A March Tale" won the Association for Mormon Letters Award for Drama in 1995. Among his many plays is God's Fisherman a play about Wilford Woodruff. His work Joyful Noise about George Handel composing the Messiah, was first performed in 1998 at BYU and later by the Lamb's Players Theatre in San Diego, California.

He left BYU to teach at Utah Valley University in the mid-1990s, and then at the University of Utah in 1999.

Slover also wrote the script for the film Minerva Teichert: A Mission in Paint.

Slover also wrote the book The Christmas Chronicles: The Legend of Santa Claus.

Slover's play "Virtue" about Hildegard of Bingen received its world premiere at Plan-B Theatre Company in February 2017.

Slover is a Latter-day Saint.

References

Samuel French link
University of Utah bio page on Slover
Mormon Literature Database entry on Slover
review of Slover's work
Mahonri Stewart. Saints on Stage: An Anthology of Mormon Drama Zarahemla Books, 2013. 
New York Times review of Joyful Noise

External links
Interview with Tim Slover on his play Virtue, Healthy Hildegard, 2017

Living people
Brigham Young University alumni
University of Michigan alumni
University of Utah faculty
American dramatists and playwrights
American Latter Day Saints
Year of birth missing (living people)